Ambrosia Organic Farm is an Indian organic food and farming company based in Goa. It is India's first organic company established in 1993.

The company is running with the support of more than 4000 organic farmers across India.

History 
In 1978 A London based David Gower moved to Goa, India and was so impressed by the culture and set up a 5-acre organic farm in Siolim, Goa and started Ambrosia Organic Farm in 1993. He began growing tomato, capsicum and other exotic vegetables and fruits and supply the vegetables and fruits to nearby restaurants for salads and that’s how the name ‘Saladbaba’ came to be. He met a 16-year-old boy Janardan Khorate, who was passionate and determined. He adopted Janardan Khorate and after being influenced by him he handed over Ambrosia to him officially in 2008. Janardan Khorate is also known as John and now popularly known as Saladbaba. Since he took control, Ambrosia Organic Farm has grown significantly and is now a business worth Rs 40 crores after beginning with just Rs 10 lakhs.

Janardan Khorate with his company also run two schools at the Maharashtra-Goa border where children get everything free in school. They also connected orphanage schools across Goa and provide them with food and clothes. The company has also been helping kids as they receive 20 per cent of Ambrosia Organic Farm’s revenues for their education.

References 

Organic farming organizations
Agricultural organisations based in India
Companies established in 1993
1993 establishments in Goa
Agriculture companies of India